Red Fox is a British television film, a thriller based on the international bestselling 1979 novel of the same name by Gerald Seymour. Originally aired on ITV in two parts on 8 and 15 December 1991, it stars John Hurt, Jane Birkin, Didier Flamand, François Négret, and Brian Cox. It was produced by Celtic Films in association with LWT for the ITV network.

Cast
John Hurt as Archie Carpenter
Jane Birkin as Violet Harrison
Didier Flamand as Paul de Vigny
François Négret as Louis
Brian Cox as Geoffrey Harrison
Corinne Touzet as Justine
Geoffrey Whitehead as Ambassador
Michael Thomas as Johnson
Marc Samuel as Anatole
John Vine as Woodley
David Saville as Sir David Adams

Episodes

References

External links

1991 British television series debuts
1991 British television series endings
1990s British drama television series
1990s British television miniseries
ITV television dramas
British thriller television series
Television shows based on British novels
Television series by ITV Studios
London Weekend Television shows
English-language television shows
Television shows set in London
Television shows set in France